Deus absconditus (Latin: "hidden God") refers to the Christian theological concept of the fundamental unknowability of the essence of God. The term is derived from the Old Testament of the Christian Bible, specifically from the Book of Isaiah: "Truly, you are a God who hides himself, Oh God of Israel, the Savior". This concept was particularly important for the theological thought of the medieval Christian theologians Thomas Aquinas, Nicholas of Cusa, John Calvin, and Martin Luther. 

Luther unfolded his views on Deus absconditus in his theological treatise De Servo Arbitrio in 1525. But he had already hinted at this idea in his lectures on the Book of Psalms and in his lecture on the Epistle to the Romans ten years earlier. The opposite of Deus absconditus in Lutheran theology is Deus revelatus (the revealed God).

In the Kingdom of France, the concept was important to the Jansenist movement, which included Blaise Pascal and Jean Racine. The French philosopher Lucien Goldmann would title a 1964 book on Pascal and Racine, The Hidden God: A Study of Tragic Vision in the Pensées of Pascal and the Tragedies of Racine.

See also 
 Deus deceptor
 Deus otiosus
 Ethical monotheism
 History of Christian theology
 Outline of theology
 Philosophical theology
 Theodicy
 Theology of the Cross

References

Bibliography 
 Volker Leppin: Deus absconditus und Deus revelatus. Transformationen mittelalterlicher Theologie in der Gotteslehre von "De servo arbitrio"; in: Berliner Theologische Zeitschrift 22 (2005), S. 55–69; 
 Martin Luther: Vom unfreien Willen: dass der freie Wille nichts sei. Antwort D. Martin Luthers an Erasmus von Rotterdam; deutsche Übersetzung von De servo arbitrio, übersetzt von Bruno Jordahn, hrsg. v. Georg Merz; München 1983
 Horst Beintker: Luthers Gotteserfahrung und Gottesanschauung; in: Leben und Werk Martin Luthers von 1526 bis 1546 – Festgabe zu seinem 500. Geburtstag, Band 1; Berlin 19852; S. 39–62

God in Christianity